The Nidaros Cathedral West Front (Nidarosdomens Vestfront), which includes multiple sculptures, was the final portion of the Nidaros Cathedral in Trondheim, Norway that was restored. Nidaros Cathedral is the world's northernmost medieval cathedral and Norway's national sanctuary. The West Front is the cathedral's main facade and one of the most beautiful and ornate portions of the church. The restoration of the West Front took from 1905 to 1983 and was worked on by a large number of sculptors. In 1869, the Nidaros Cathedral Restoration Workshop was founded with the purpose of restoring the Cathedral, and celebrated a 150 years Anniversary in 2019.

A picture of the West Front from 1661 shows extensive deterioration, with only the bottom sections left standing. Only five statues from the Middle Ages have survived. The restoration of the West Front took from 1905 to 1983 and was worked on by a large number of sculptors. 

The largest church bell in Norway hangs in the West Front's north tower. Installed in 1964, it weighs 2,400 kg, and people say that it can be heard in Melhus, all of 30 km away, when the wind is in the right direction. The church has three bells. The 'Great Bell' is the oldest and was cast in Hoorn in the Netherlands in 1751.

This part of the church is also the most recent of the original cathedral constructions; archbishop Sigurd Eindrideson laid the cornerstone for the west front in 1248. The construction was not yet complete when the church was burnt in 1328. The original design for the west face is not known, but one can assume that it was never built to those original plans; it is reasonable to assume that a screen front similar to that used elsewhere was planned on the west. Screen fronts were often rectangular and served as a cover to conceal the rest of the church.  English cathedrals from the same period, among others Lincoln Cathedral, Wells Cathedral and Salisbury Cathedral, had similar fronts. The west front had three entrances and is flanked by two smaller towers on each side of the façade.

Reconstruction

Of the overall Nidaros Cathedral restoration, reconstruction of the west front stirred the most debate.  The Nidaros Cathedral had not been well maintained and the west front was among the most deteriorated parts of the church in 1869. The difficulty in restoration was exacerbated by the fact that it was the portion of the church which was the most complex, least well documented, and most difficult to reconstruct. The initial condition was so bad that many professionals opposed any attempt to restore without major reconstruction.

There is limited documentation of the west front, as it was rebuilt after the fire in the 1328 and later fires. The oldest known depiction of the west front is a print prepared by Jacob Mortensson Maschius (~1630–78) from 1661, which shows two full floors and part of the third floor. Evidence indicates that there was a window on the third floor, as in Lincoln Cathedral.  Here it is inset a curved tip rose window in Gothic style. Written sources document that Nidaros Cathedral had such a rose window:

Absalon Pederssøn Beyer (1528–75) recorded around 1560.  Gunnar Danbolt (1940–) citing a different source from 1500 in his book Nidarosdomen, fra Kristkirke til nasjonalmonument (Nidarosdomen, from Christian church to national monument) published in  1997, quoted:

There is such a "karfunkelsten" or carbuncle (an older term for any red-precious stones) in the center of the rose window today; it traditionally symbolizes Christ.

Architect Christian Christie
Since there was limited documentation on the original west front layout, there was an extensive discussion of what was appropriate for the restoration in 1903. The cathedral architect, Christian Christie was uncertain whether the Gothic style or a practical, functional structure was preferable. In his sketch of 1903 the west face did not include a rose window, for which he was subjected to criticism.

The restoration of the west front did not begin before his death in 1906. Nils Ryjord took over temporarily after Christie's death.

Architect Olaf Nordhagen
After Christies death, an architectural competition was held for design of the west front, and the shared first prize went to Olaf Nordhagen   and Henrik Bull. In 1909 Nordhagen was employed, and his sketch of the west front prepared in 1913, which contained the front screen, rose window and side tower, was approved by the Norwegian Parliament. However, in 1915 he made radical changes in the drawings, while the historian Macody Lund proposed a completely different configuration for the west face and west gable, based on the golden ratio. This conflict of views led to significant delays in the restoration, culminating in convening an international expert commission, which rejected Macody Lunds proposed approach in 1923. In 1930, five years after Nordhagen's death, only the first three floors and the rose window completed.

Architect Helge Thiis
In 1929, a new architectural competition was held, and the proposal that won,  Kongespeilet was prepared by Helge Thiis. This started the last phase in the restoration of the west front. Thiis was appointed as the cathedral architect, a position he held from 1930 until his death in 1972. He believed that the work on the west front was essentially an artistic exercise in the spirit and form of Gothic architecture and of the Church as a whole, than a reconstruction. His work has much in common with Nordhagen's approved sketch, and represents the west front as it appears today.

Construction
This concluded that the front should be built following a rhythmic proportional system: "The seated statues have the same height as the first pictorial series, the deep niches as second pictorial series, and in height from cornice band under the royal floor up to the tip of the arch is equal to twice the lower height." The rectangular screen fronts baseline dimensions are based on the principle of the golden ratio. The two columns on each side of the rose window are placed according to this principle, the same is the position of the horizontal delineations between the second and third and between the third and fourth alcove openings. These lines are most clearly visible on the side towers.

The rectangular baseline also provides the baseline of an equilateral triangle with a vertex in the west gable front, which was completed in 1963. The rose window forms a circle in the triangle. A circle in an equilateral triangle is often regarded as the symbol for "God's eye."

The rose window

None of the Nidaros Cathedral's original stained glass windows were intact when the restoration work started in 1869. The concept followed was to reconstruct the church in the Gothic style, and as a result the new stained glass windows should also have standard medieval themes. In 1907 the architect Gabriel Kielland (1871–1960) won a competition for new paintings for Nidaros Cathedral's southern gable. In addition Kielland delivered proposals to all of the church windows, and received the commission to create the stained glass windows. The paintings are iconographic imagery which were produced in collaboration with Oluf Kolsrud (1885–1945), professor of church history. The themes are from the Bible stories and Saint's legends, the windows on the north side of the church have a blue background and shows predominantly scenes from the Old Testament, the windows on the south side of the church have a red background and shows a corresponding predominance of scenes of the New Testament, while the rose window motif that faces the sunset (west), symbolizes doomsday. The rose window's structural layout followed the design by cathedral architect Olaf Nordhagen, and the diameter is built up around an eightfold symmetry with the innermost parts proportioned such that the diameter is formed of 16 sheets.

The window expresses how things move outward from Christ and converge back to him by doomsday. In the middle is a red gem, which symbolizes Christ. The rays outward represent yellow flames in a blue background. Angels are located at the end of each flame; those on the upper half are singing and playing while those on the lower half are six winged. In the outermost ring are the angels of the judgment. Between the angels of judgment are the symbols for the four Evangelists. In the upper left is the Matthew the Evangelist as an angel with a written scroll. In the upper right is John the Evangelist represented as an eagle. In the bottom right is Luke the Evangelist as an ox. In the bottom left is Mark the Evangelist as a lion. The painted glass in the window consists of over 10,000 pieces. The rose window was presented as a gift from the women of Norway for St. Olav's anniversary in 1930, it was completed the same year and is regarded as Kielland's masterpiece.

Sculptures
The sculptures on the west front are partially based on Maschius' drawings, on guesswork and on pure fantasy. Originally, the wall was framed with two side towers, and had a series of sculptures. The few of them that survived clearly show a French influence, particularly traceable to the cathedral in Reims. It is unknown how many rows of sculptures there originally were – only the bottom row survived the fires and decay of the late Middle Ages; the five remaining sculptures are in poor condition. These sculptures are now in the museum in the Archbishop's Palace. Work on the sculptures started in 1929. The sculptures depict both biblical and historical characters.

The two lower rows of sculpture, proposed by Professor Oluf Kolsrud in 1928, are based on the engraving by Jacob Maschius. Kolsrud was an historical adviser on the church's restoration, and prepared an iconography for the sculptures. His proposal to place statues on the "royal floor" – although without evidence of historical precedent – was approved in 1935. It was assumed that the medieval sculptures were based on living models, and to a large extent, this concept is applied to the new sculptures. Thus the sculpture of Bishop Sigurd borrowed features from the poet Aasmund Olavsson Vinje, and Kristofer Leirdal's statue of the Archangel Michael on the top of the northwest tower was based, according to the sculptor, on the face of Bob Dylan – inspired by Dylan's opposition to the Vietnam War.

Above the row of kings, on top of each column that separates the niches containing sculptures of kings and prophets of the Old Testament, there are smaller sculptures that symbolize the twelve months in a year. These small sculptures, Gothic in style, were modeled by Odd Hilt in 1937–1938 and represent different tasks appropriate to the corresponding month of the year. Only one of them, the September sculpture representing the apple harvest, is female. Similar figures appropriate to the months can be found in several major European cathedrals dating from the Middle Ages, especially those in France.

The central axis of the west front is dominated by Jesus Christ, to whom the Nidaros Cathedral is dedicated. Christ comprises the stem of a tree, and the rows of sculptures represent branches of the tree. At the bottom of the middle axis lies a sculpted group of motifs from the crucifixion - the crucified Christ is based on a model by Wilhelm Rasmussen. Above the rose window is a relief with the same theme as the window's subject – doomsday – with Christ sitting in judgment; the relief was designed by Stinius Fredriksen. At the top of the west gable is a relief with Christ triumphant - the transfigured Christ, designed by Kristofer Leirdalen. Danbolt discusses these sculptures in his works about Nidarosdomen, noting that:
The crucifixion represents the possibility of salvation. In the doomsday sequence it is clear how this possibility is developed. And Christ triumphant draws our attention upward to the sky, which again represents realizing the possibility of salvation. This illustrates the second article of the Christian declaration of faith, "Christ has risen."

The sculptures spread from the center span toward each side. The top row contains the images of Christ's spiritual and physical ancestors. The middle row shows the Expulsion from Paradise and the Annunciation, on opposite sides of the rosette, as well as the Norwegian saints and their virtues. The bottom row of sculptures shows the Apostles, along with Saints and Kings who spread Christianity throughout Europe.

Additionally, the western façade is replete with lesser sculptures, masks, angels, gargoyles, and a large collection of fauna: bears, donkeys, elephants, cocks and bees. This wealth of sculpture is intended to represent the divine work of God's creation. In addition, there are reliefs, ornaments, arches and columns topped by ornate, richly carved capitals. Helge Thiis said that "no human eye can apprehend from the ground all the rich details contained in this Church".

Many of Norway's leading sculptors joined in creating the western façade, working for several decades. These include Gustav Vigeland (1869–1943), Wilhelm Rasmussen (1879–1965), Dyre Vaa (1903–1980), Stinius Fredriksen (1902–1977), Nic Schiøll (1901–1984), Arne Kvibergskaar, Odd Hilt (1915–1986), Knut Skinnarland (1909–1993), Tone Thiis Schjetne (1928-), Sivert Donali (1931-), Kristofer Leirdal (1915–2010), Arnold Haukeland (1920–1983), Anne Raknes (1914–2001), Helge Thiis and August Albertsen.

Details of sculptures

References

Literature 

 
 
 
 
  
 
 
 
 
 
 
 Nidaros Domkirkes Restaureringsarbeider, Hvem er hvem på vestfronten, folder, Trondheim 2005
 
 
 
 
 

Churches in Trondheim